Gloria Carter Spann (October 22, 1926 – March 5, 1990) was a motorcyclist and activist. Spann was a sister of former president Jimmy Carter. She was noted as one of the first women inducted into Harley-Davidson’s 100,000 Mile Club, was named Most Outstanding Female Motorcyclist in 1978 and worked as an activist for motorcycle rights.

Early years
Gloria Carter was the second of four children, and the first daughter born to James Earl Carter, Sr. (1894–1953) and Lillian Gordy Carter (1898–1983) and was 24 months younger than her brother, Jimmy. When Jimmy was small, he pronounced her name "Go Go", a nickname which stuck. By many accounts, including that of their mother, Gloria was the smartest, most interesting, most attractive, most outgoing, and most talented of the Carter children. As children competing for the affections of their parents, the relationship between Spann and the future president was somewhat strained but the two grew extremely close in their later years.  Her brother Jimmy shot her with a BB gun after she threw a wrench at him when they were children.

Carter graduated from high school in June 1944 and enrolled in Georgia Southwestern College where she began to study journalism. Her plans were deferred when she married a war hero named William Everett Hardy from Americus. The Carters disapproved of the match, as the groom was a former drug store clerk. This was not a suitable job for the well-to-do families at the time. The marriage produced a son, William Everett (Hardy) Spann (1946–1997). Gloria returned to Georgia in 1949 from Texas, and her father, Earl Carter, was upset by the brutal beatings Gloria suffered at the hands of her husband. With the help of her father, Gloria had her marriage annulled in 1949. On December 15, 1950, Carter-Hardy married Walter Guy Spann (1925–2012), a farmer from Webster County, Georgia, and he adopted the son of her first marriage. Walter and Gloria Spann produced no children of their own together. By all accounts, the two had a very happy, affectionate marriage which lasted almost 40 years, until her death.

In 1964, Spann resigned from the Baptist Church the Carters belonged to after the church voted not to lift its ban on black people from attending.

Carter presidency: 1977–1981

Although she had some level of fame of her own before Jimmy's election, she was not forced into the spotlight until her brother was elected president. Gloria was probably the sibling who shunned the spotlight most during her brother's years in office. Prior to Jimmy Carter's achieving the presidency in 1976, Spann had participated in several campaigns for her brother. In his bids for the governorship of Georgia, she made countless phone calls and mailed numerous pamphlets in order to win votes for Carter.

Spann maintained a relatively low profile as she and her husband, Walter, participated in cross-country cycling on their Harley-Davidson motorcycles. Spann began cycling in about 1967. In 1977, Span published a book of letters written by her mother detailing her mother's struggles and accomplishments during two years working for the Peace Corps in India. She and Walter were also members of Union Life, a religious brotherhood.

Spann's son caused her great distress. He became a nocturnal wanderer and often disappeared for three or four days at a time, leaving Spann frantic. As her husband made good money, Gloria was not required to work, but since her son was continually expelled from schools, she began work as a secretary in order to send her son to a private school. Gloria discussed her trouble with her evangelist sister, Ruth Stapleton. At Ruth's cabin in the mountains, Gloria picked up material that encouraged the reader to give their problems to God.

William Carter Spann moved to California in 1969 and Gloria credited his troubled life as the main factor that turned her back toward her faith. William Spann often said that his mother rejected him and used this as a means to justify his unconventional behavior. Gloria Carter Spann did not see her son even once during the last 21 years of her life.

Though William had moved out to California and severed contact with his family, this did not keep him out of the spotlight. During Jimmy Carter's 1976 presidential campaign, the media's intense scrutiny found them at William's jail cell out in California. When interviewed about his uncle's success, he stated: "He's in the White House, I'm in the big house." Gloria also received a phone call threatening to reveal that "Jimmy Carter's got a nephew in jail" if she did not pay a sum of money to keep the caller quiet. In 1979, Spann was herself arrested for disorderly conduct when she refused to stop playing a harmonica in a McWaffle restaurant in Americus, Georgia.

Spann was noted as one of the first women inducted into Harley Davidson’s 100,000 Mile Club, was named Most Outstanding Female Motorcyclist in 1978, and worked as an activist for motorcycle rights. During their years as motorcyclists, Gloria and her husband became "den mother" and father to the younger riders. The Spanns planted a large garden for the bikers each year and canned the vegetables to serve as they often had unexpected guests. Their farmhouse was arranged for multiple cots or sleeping bags. Walter constructed a four-hole outhouse to accommodate bikers who were cruising through the South or headed down to the races at Daytona.

Illness and death
In the fall of 1989, Spann learned that she had pancreatic cancer. The Spanns, both well into their sixties, were looking forward to retiring to their farmhouse and continuing their interest in motorcycles. Pancreatic cancer, as is common, was detected in its late stages when the only treatment is palliative care. Spann had been a smoker but had broken the habit in the years prior to her death. Like her two younger siblings who had died of the disease during the 1980s in their 50s, she declined life-extending treatment.

On March 5, 1990, Spann died of complications from pancreatic cancer, at the age of 63. Her father and her sister, Ruth Carter Stapleton, and brother, Billy Carter, had also died from pancreatic cancer. Her mother died of breast cancer. Gloria's tombstone reads, "She rides in Harley Heaven." Spann is buried in the Lebanon Baptist Church Cemetery near Plains, Georgia, where her parents and brother, Billy Carter, are also buried.

References

Sources
http://www.bikerrogue.com/Articles/Bros_Events/goodbye_gloria.htm
https://web.archive.org/web/20050315170533/http://www.bassharp.com/bspress.htm
https://web.archive.org/web/20011101131356/http://www.hdfoundation.org/testread/family.html
Carter Sister Injured on Cycle
https://www.nytimes.com/1989/12/01/us/jimmy-carter-s-sister-has-pancreas-cancer.html
https://www.nytimes.com/1990/03/07/obituaries/gloria-carter-spann-ex-president-s-sister-63.html

1926 births
1990 deaths
People from Plains, Georgia
Carter family
Georgia Southwestern State University alumni
Deaths from cancer in Georgia (U.S. state)
Deaths from pancreatic cancer
20th-century American politicians